The Howling Hex XI is an album by The Howling Hex.  It was released as a CD and LP by Drag City in 2007.

Track listing
"Keychains" (Neil Michael Hagerty) – 2:36
"Fifth Dimensional Johnny B. Goode" (Mike Signs) – 3:11
"Martyr Lectures Comedian" (Hagerty) – 2:20
"Live Wire" (Andy MacLeod) – 2:18
"Dr. Slaughter" (Phil Jenks, Signs) – 2:43
"Let Fridays Decide" (Jenks) – 1:45
"Lines in the Sky" (Signs) – 3:36
"Save/Spend" (Lee) – 2:43
"Ambulance Across the Street" (Hagerty) – 2:23
"Everybody's Doing It" (Signs) – 2:42
"The 88" (Hagerty) – 4:16
"Theme" (Howling Hex) – 2:24

Personnel
The Howling Hex:
Neil Michael Hagerty – six-string bass, vocals
Phil Jenks – percussion, drums, vocals
Rob Lee – saxophone, flute, vocals
Andy MacLeod – drums, percussion, vocals
Mike Signs – guitar

References

2007 albums
Howling Hex albums
Drag City (record label) albums